Alzo J. Reddick was born November 15, 1937 in Alturas, Florida.

Reddick previously served as a Representative in the House of Representatives of the U.S. state of Florida. He lives in Orlando, Florida with his family.

Education
He received his master's degree from Florida A&M University, his doctorate degree from Nova University, and another doctorate from the University of Florida. He was the first faculty member, and later assistant Dean of Student Affairs and Co-ordinator of Minority Affairs for Rollins College.

References

External links
Official Website of Alzo Reddick

|-

University of Florida alumni
Members of the Florida House of Representatives
1937 births
Living people
People from Polk County, Florida
20th-century American politicians